Bécs is the sixth studio album by Austrian electronic music producer and guitarist Fennesz, released 28 April 2014 by Mego Records. The album has been described as a conceptual and sonic successor to Fennesz's well-received 2001 album Endless Summer and is his first solo release since 2008's Black Sea.

Background 
Bécs is described as a departure from the drone music influences of Black Sea, instead featuring contemporary pop music structures. Pitchfork noted the album's "twinkly and bright" melodies, with the album's use of distortion "(walking) a tightrope between oceanic envelopment and repellant destruction."

The track "Paroles" is notable for a stripped-down sound that does not feature as many audio effects as most of Fennesz's work.

Reception 

Bécs was well-received by critics upon release; it currently holds a score of 86 from Metacritic, indicating "universal acclaim."

London-based music magazine Uncut praised the album, calling it "an entirely ravishing aesthetic experience." Exclaim! published a similarly adulatory review, writing that, "With Bécs, Fennesz achieves the near-impossible, crafting a musical sequel that retains the energy, vision, and flow of its predecessor."

Pitchfork gave Bécs a generally positive review, remarking that it was "often gorgeous" but arguing that its sonic similarity to Endless Summer "makes you wonder about motivation."

Track listing

References 

2014 albums
Fennesz albums